This is an alphabetical list of the fungal taxa as recorded from South Africa. Currently accepted names have been appended.

Um
Genus: Umbilicaria (Lichens)
Umbilicaria flavovirescens Leight.
Umbilicaria galuca Stizenb.
Umbilicaria hottentotta Fee.
Umbilicaria lecanorocarpa Krempelh.
Umbilicaria membranacea Laur.
Umbilicaria papulosa Nyl.
Umbilicaria pustulata Hoffm. f. minor Cromb.
Umbilicaria pustulata var. papillata Hampe.
Umbilicaria pustulata var. papulosa Tuck.
Umbilicaria rubiginosa Pers.
Umbilicaria thunbergii Reinke

Un
Genus: Uncinula
Uncinula aspera Doidge
Uncinula circinata Cooke & Peck.
Uncinula combreticola Doidge
Uncinula eylesii Doidge
Uncinula incrassata Salm
Uncinula necator Burr.
Uncinula pterocarpi Doidge
Uncinula polvchaeta Berk. & Curt, ex Ellis.
Uncinula sp.

Ur
Genus: Urceolaria 
Urceolaria actinostoma Pers. ex Ach.
Urceolaria actinostoma var. aenea Müll.Arg.
Urceolaria actinostoma var. caesiopluinbea Nyl
Urceolaria capitata Nees.
Urceolaria cinerea Ach.
Urceolaria cinereocaesia Ach.
Urceolaria deuteria Syd.
Urceolaria excavata Ach.
Urceolaria scruposa β arenaria Schaer.
Urceolaria scruposa f. arenaria Ach.
Urceolaria subcuprea Nyl.
 
Order: Uredinales

Genus: Uredinopsis
Uredinopsis macrosperma P.Magn.
 
Genus: Uredo
Uredo africana Lagerh.
Uredo aloes Cooke.
Uredo alysicarpi Doidge.
Uredo ancylanthi P.Henn.
Uredo asclepiadis-fruticosi Doidge.
Uredo aterrima Thuem.
Uredo augeae Pole Evans.
Uredo augeae Syd.
Uredo balsamodendri Cooke.
Uredo brachylaenae Doidge.
Uredo brideliae Doidge.
Uredo caricis-petitianae Doidge.
Uredo carpodini P.Henn.
Uredo cassiae-mimosoides Doidge.
Uredo celastrineae Cooke & Mass.
Uredo cephalandrae Thuem.
Uredo clematidis Berk.
Uredo combreticola Doidge.
Uredo commelinae Kalchbr.
Uredo compositarum var. melantherae Cooke.
Uredo crotalariicola P.Henn.
Uredo cryptolepidis Cooke.
Uredo cussoniae Cooke.
Uredo cypericola P.Henn.
Uredo detergibilis P.Henn.
Uredo digitariaecola Thuem.
Uredo disae v.d.Byl
Uredo dissotidis Cooke.
Uredo dissolidis-longicaudae P.Henn.
Uredo dolichospora Kalchbr.
Uredo dombeyae Doidge.
Uredo ectadiopsis Cooke.
Uredo ecteinanthi Kalchbr.
Uredo ehrartae-calycinae Doidge.
Uredo eriospermi MacOwan.
Uredo fici Cast.
Uredo filicum Klotzsch.
Uredo fuirenae P.Henn.
Uredo gardeniae-thunbergiae P. Henn.
Uredo geranii DC., (1806) f. pelargonii-alchemilloides Thuem. accepted as Puccinia pelargonii-zonalis Doidge (1926)
Uredo geranii f. pelargonii-zonalis Thuem. accepted as Puccinia pelargonii-zonalis Doidge (1926)
Uredo gliae Lindr.
Uredo grewiae Pat. & Har.
Uredo harmsiana P.Henn.
Uredo heteromorphae MacOwan.
Uredo homeriae Bubak.
Uredo hyperici-leucoptychodis Doidge.
Uredo hypoestis de Toni
Uredo indigoferae Doidge.
Uredo ixiae Lev.
Uredo ixiae Rud.
Uredo kaempferiae Syd.
Uredo kampuluvensis P.Henn.
Uredo leguminosarum Link.
Uredo lepisclinis Thuem.
Uredo leucadis Syd.
Uredo linearis Pers.
Uredo lonchocarpi Doidge.
Uredo longaenis P.Henn.
Uredo lotononi Doidge.
Uredo lucida Theum.
Uredo lupini Berk. & Curt.
Uredo macrosperum Cooke.
Uredo mixta Duby f. Salicis capensis Thuem.
Uredo monsoniae Syd.
Uredo moraeae Kalchbr.
Uredo myrsiphylli Thuem.
Uredo pelargonii Thuem.
Uredo phaseolorum de Bary.
Uredo pilulaeformis Berk.
Uredo plectranthi Kalchbr.
Uredo pogonarthriae Syd.
Uredo polygalae Kalchbr.
Uredo polypodii DC.
Uredo pretoriensis Syd.
Uredo psoraleae-polystictae Doidge.
Uredo pychnostachydis Kalchbr.
Uredo rhoina Syd.
Uredo rhynchosiae Cooke.
Uredo ricini Biv. Bern.
Uredo rottboelliae Diet.
Uredo rabigo-vera DC. f. digitariae-sanguinalis Thuem.
Uredo rumicum DC.
Uredo rumicum f. Rumicis obtusifolii capensis Thuem.
Uredo satyrii Mass.
Uredo schizachyrii Doidge.
Uredo scholzii P.Henn.
Uredo scirpi-corymbosi Doidge.
Uredo scirpi-maritimi Doidge.
Uredo sempertecta Thuem.
Uredo stenotaphri Syd.
Uredo stylosanthis P.Henn.
Uredo transversalis Thuem.
Uredo valerianae DC. f. valerianae-capensis Thuem.
Uredo vangueriae Cooke.
Uredo viborgiae P.Henn.
Uredo zehneriae Thuem.
Uredo sp.

Genus: Urocystis
Urocystis agropyri Schroet.
Urocystis gladioli Wemh.
Urocystis hypoxidis Thaxt.
Urocystis occulta Rabenh.
Urocystis ornithoglossi Zundel.
Urocystis tritici Körn., (1877), accepted as Urocystis agropyri (Preuss) A.A. Fisch. Waldh., (1867)
 
Genus: Uromyces
Uromyces albucae Kalchbr. & Cooke.
Uromyces alchemillae Lev.
Uromyces aloes P.Magn.
Uromyces aloicola P.Henn.
Uromyces alysicarpi Wakef. & Hansf.
Uromyces anomathecae Cooke.
Uromyces antholyzae Syd.
Uromyces appendiculatus Link.
Uromyces argyrolobii Doidge.
Uromyces avicularae Schroet.
Uromyces babianae Doidge.
Uromyces badius Syd.
Uromyces barbeyanus P.Henn.
Uromyces betae Lev. accepted as Uromyces beticola (Bellynck) Boerema (1987)
Uromyces bidentis Lagerh.
Uromyces bolusii Mass.
Uromyces bona-spei Bubak.
Uromyces bulbinis Theum. 
Uromyces bylianus Doidge 
Uromyces capensis Doidge 
Uromyces caryophyllinus Wint. (sic) possibly (Schrank) J. Schröt., (1884) accepted as Uromyces dianthi (Pers.) Niessl, (1872)
Uromyces cassiae-mimosoides Doidge 
Uromyces chloridis Doidge 
Uromyces circinalis Kalchbr. & Cooke 
Uromyces clignyi Pat. & Har. 
Uromyces cluytiae Kalchbr. & Cooke 
Uromyces commelinae Cooke 
Uromyces comptus Syd. 
Uromyces cyperi P.Henn. 
Uromyces delagoensis Bubak. 
Uromyces dieramatis Doidge 
Uromyces dolichi Cooke 
Uromyces dolichi Syd. 
Uromyces dolicholi Arth. 
Uromyces drimiopsidis Doidge 
Uromyces ecklonii Bubak. 
Uromyces ehrhartae-giganteae Doidge 
Uromyces eragrostidis Tracy. 
Uromyces eriospermi Kalchbr. & Cooke 
Uromyces ermelensis Doidge 
Uromyces erythronii Pass. 
Uromyces erythronii Pass. v. drimiopsidis
Uromyces euphorbias Cooke & Peck. 
Uromyces euphorbiicola Tranzsch. 
Uromyces fabae (Pers.) de Bary, (1879), accepted as Uromyces viciae-fabae var. viciae-fabae (Pers.) J. Schröt., (1875)
Uromyces ferrariae Doidge 
Uromyces fiorianus Sacc. 
Uromyces freesiae Bubak. 
Uromyces geissorhizae P.Henn. 
Uromyces geranii (DC.) G.H. Otth & Wartm., (1847), accepted as Puccinia pelargonii-zonalis Doidge (1926)
Uromyces gladioli P.Henn. 
Uromyces greenstockii Doidge 
Uromyces harmsianus Doidge 
Uromyces heteromorphae Thuem. 
Uromyces hobsoni Vize. 
Uromyces holubii Doidge 
Uromyces hyperici-frondosi Arth. 
Uromyces hypoxidis Cooke 
Uromyces inaequialtus Lasch. 
Uromyces ipomoeae Berk. 
Uromyces ixiae Wint. 
Uromyces junci (Schwein.) Tul. & C.Tul (1854), accepted as Stegocintractia junci (Schwein.) M.Piepenbr. (2000)
Uromyces kentaniensis Doidge 
Uromyces krantzbergensis Doidge 
Uromyces lachenaliae Doidge 
Uromyces leptodermus Syd. 
Uromyces liliacearum Ung. 
Uromyces limonii Lev. 
Uromyces lugubris Kalchbr. 
Uromyces macowani Bubak. 
Uromyces maireanus Syd. 
Uromyces massoniae Doidge 
Uromyces medicaginis Pass., (1872), accepted as Uromyces striatus J. Schröt., 1870
Uromyces melantherae Cooke 
Uromyces melasphaerulae Syd. 
Uromyces microsorus Kalchbr. & Cooke 
Uromyces mimusopsidis Cooke 
Uromyces moraeae Syd. 
Uromyces mucunae Rabenh. 
Uromyces natalensis P.Magn. 
Uromyces oxalidis Lév. 
Uromyces papillatus Kalchbr. & Cooke 
Uromyces paradoxus Syd. 
Uromyces pedicellata Pole Evans. 
Uromyces peglerae Pole Evans.
Uromyces phaseolorum DC.
Uromyces polemanniae Kalchbr. & Cooke 
Uromyces polygoni Fuck.
Uromyces pretoriensis Doidge
Uromyces proeminens Lev.
Uromyces prunorum Link. var. amygdali Kalchbr.
Uromyces pseudarthriae Cooke
Uromyces psoraleae Peck.
Uromyces pulvinatus Kalchbr. & Cooke
Uromyces rhodesicus Wakef.
Uromyces rhynchosiae Cooke emend. Doidge 
Uromyces ricini Biv.
Uromyces romouleae v.d.Byl & Werd.
Uromyces romuleae Doidge
Uromyces rumicis Wint.
Uromyces saginatus Syd.
Uromyces sanguinalis Evans.
Uromyces schinzianus P.Henn.
Uromyces scillarum Wint.
Uromyces scrophulariae DC.
Uromyces setariae-italicae Yoshino.
Uromyces sparaxidis Syd.
Uromyces stellenbossiensis v.d.Byl.
Uromyces strauchii Doidge
Uromyces striatus  J. Schröt., (1870),
Uromyces stylochitonis Doidge
Uromyces tenuicutis McAlp.
Uromyces thwaitesii Berk. & Br.
Uromyces transversalis Wint.
Uromyces trichoneurae Doidge
Uromyces trifolii Lev.
Uromyces trollipi Kalchbr. & MacOwan.
Uromyces urgines Kalchbr.
Uromyces valerianae Fuck.
Uromyces ventosa Syd.
Uromyces vignae Barcl.
Uromyces walsoniae Syd.
Uromyces zeyheri Bubak.

Genus: Uropyxis
Uropyxis gerstneri Doidge
Uropyxis steudneri P.Magn. var. rhodesica Doidge

Us
Genus: Usnea (Lichens)
Usnea acanthera Vain.
Usnea aequatoriana Motyka.
Usnea africana Motyka.
Usnea amplissima Stirt.
Usnea angulata Ach.
Usnea angulata f. gonioides Hue.
Usnea angulata var. flaccida Müll.Arg.
Usnea arthroclada Fee subsp. arthrodadodes Vain.
Usnea articulata Hoffm.
Usnea articulata f. minor Krempelh.
Usnea australis Fr.
Usnea baileyi Zahlbr.
Usnea barbata Fr.
Usnea barbata f. ceratina Ach.
Usnea barbata f. florida Fr.
Usnea barbata var. articulata Ach.
Usnea barbata var. australis Müll.Arg.
Usnea barbata var. farinosa Müll.Arg.
Usnea barbata var. florida f. australis Vain.
Usnea barbata* Usnea florida var. comosa Wain.
Usnea barbata var. scabrosa Müll.Arg.
Usnea capensis Hoffm.
Usnea capensis Motyka.
Usnea cartiliginea Laur.
Usnea ceratina Ach.
Usnea ceratina var. picta Steiner.
Usnea ceratina var. scabrosa Aoh.
Usnea comosa Rohl.
Usnea contorta Jatta.
Usnea comuta Korb.
Usnea dasypoga Rohl.
Usnea dasypoga var. plicata Crorab.
Usnea dasypoga var. plicata f. annulata Hue.
Usnea dasypoga var. plicata f. dasypogoides Hue.
Usnea dasypogoides Nyl.
Usnea delicata Vain.
Usnea densirostra Tayl. 
Usnea diffracta Vain.
Usnea distensa Stirt.
Usnea farinosa Zahlbr.
Usnea flaccida Motyka.
Usnea flexilis Stirt.
Usnea florida Wigg.
Usnea florida var. asperrima Müll.Arg.
Usnea florida var australis Sitzenb.
Usnea florida var. comosa Biroli.
Usnea florida var. densirostra Stizenb.
Usnea florida var. farinosa Stizenb.
Usnea florida var. ochrophora.
Usnea florida var. pulverulenta Müll.Arg.
Usnea florida var. rubiginea Michx.
Usnea florida var. scabrosa Wain.
Usnea florida var. strigosa Ach.
Usnea florida var. subelegans Vain.
Usnea flotowii Zahlbr. var. subhispida Zahlbr.
Usnea foveolata Stirt.
Usnea fusca Motyka.
Usnea gonioides Stirt.
Usnea gracilis var. subplicata Vain.
Usnea havaasii Motyka.
Usnea hirta Wigg.
Usnea hirta var. horridula Stizenb.
Usnea hispidula Zahlbr.
Usnea horridula Motyka.
Usnea implioita Zahlbr.
Usnea intercalaris Krempelh.
Usnea laevis Nyl.
Usnea leprosa Motyka.
Usnea longissima Ach.
Usnea longissima var. horridula Müll.Arg.
Usnea maculata Stirt.
Usnea malacea Zahlbr. var. subelegans Zahlbr.
Usnea molliuscula Stirt.
Usnea moniliformis Motyka.
Usnea mutabilis Stirt.
Usnea ochrophora Motyka.
Usnea perspinosa Motyka.
Usnea picata Motyka.
Usnea plicata Wigg.
Usnea poliotrix Krempelh.
Usnea praelonga Stirt.
Usnea primitiva Motyka.
Usnea promontorii Motyka.
Usnea pulverulenta Motyka.
Usnea pulvinata fr.
Usnea rubescens Stirt. var. rubrotincta Motyka
Usnea rubicunda Stirt.
Usnea rubiginea Massal.
Usnea rubrotincta Stirt.
Usnea sorediosula Motyka.
Usnea spilota Stirt.
Usnea steineri Zahlbr.
Usnea steineri var. tincta f. sorediosa Zahlbr.
Usnea strigosa Eaton.
Usnea strigosella Steiner.
Usnea sublurida Stirt.
Usnea submusciformis Vain.
Usnea sulcata Motyka.
Usnea transvaalensis Vain.
Usnea trichina Motyka.
Usnea trichodea Ach.
Usnea trichodeoides Vain, emend. Motyka
Usnea undulata Stirt.
Usnea sp.

Family: Usneaceae

Family: Ustilaginaceae

Order: Ustilaginales

Genus: Ustilaginoidea
Ustilaginoidea mossambicensis P.Henn.
Ustilaginoidea setariae Bref.
 
Genus: Ustilago
Ustilago affinis Ell. & Everh.
Ustilago andropogonis-finitimi Maubl.
Ustilago anthephorae Syd.
Ustilago avenae Jens. (sic), possibly (Pers.) Rostr., (1890)
Ustilago bromivora Fisch.
Ustilago capensis Reess.
Ustilago carbo Tul. f. Cynodontis dactylonis Thuem.
Ustilago cesatii Fisch. de Waldh.
Ustilago crameri Korn.
Ustilago crus-galli Tracy & Earle.
Ustilago cynodontis P.Henn.
Ustilago dactyloctaenii P.Henn.
Ustilago danthoniae Kalchbr.
Ustilago digitariae Rabenh.
Ustilago dinteri Syd.
Ustilago dregeana Tul.
Ustilago ehrhartana Zundel.
Ustilago elionuri P.Henn. & Evans.
Ustilago eragostidis-japonicana Zundel.
Ustilago evansii P.Henn.
Ustilago fingerhuthiae Syd.
Ustilago flagellata Syd.
Ustilago gigaspora Mass.
Ustilago henningsii Sacc. & Syd.
Ustilago heterospora P. Henn.
Ustilago holubii Syd.
Ustilago hordei (Pers.) Lagerh. (1889)
Ustilago hyparrheniae Hopkins.
Ustilago inconspicua Pole Evans.
Ustilago ischaemi Fuck.
Ustilago jensenii Rostr. accepted as Ustilago avenae (Pers.) Rostr., (1890)
Ustilago kelleri Wille.
Ustilago levis (Kellerm. & Swingle) Magnus (1896), accepted as Ustilago hordei (Pers.) Lagerh., (1889)
Ustilago liebenbergii Zundel.
Ustilago mariscana Zundel.
Ustilago maydis Tul. (sic) possibly Ustilago maydis (DC.) Corda, (1842)
Ustilago modesta Syd.
Ustilago neglecta Niessl.
Ustilago nuda (C.N. Jensen) Kellerm. & Swingle (1890)
Ustilago pappophori Syd.
Ustilago peglerae Bubak & Syd.
Ustilago piluliformis Tul.
Ustilago pretoriense Pole Evans.
Ustilago puellaris Syd.
Ustilago rabenhorstiana Kuhn.
Ustilago sacchari Rabenh.
Ustilago schlechteri P.Henn.
Ustilago scitaminea Syd., (1924), accepted as Sporisorium scitamineum (Syd.) M. Piepenbr., M. Stoll & Oberw. 2002
Ustilago scitaminea var. sacchari—barberi.
Ustilago segetum (Bull.?) Dittm. (sic) (species complex?)
Ustilago sladenii Pole Evans.
Ustilago sorghi Pass. accepted as Sporisorium sorghi Ehrenb. ex Link (1825)
Ustilago stenotaphri P.Henn.
Ustilago stenotaphricola
Ustilago trachypogonis Zundel.
Ustilago tragana Zundel.
Ustilago trichoneurana Zundel.
Ustilago trichophora Kunze.
Ustilago tritici Rostr.
Ustilago urochloana Zundel.
Ustilago verruculosa Wakef.
Ustilago vaillantii Tul.
Ustilago verecunda Syd.
Ustilago versatilis Syd.
Ustilago welwitschiae Bres.
Ustilago zeae Unger.
Ustilago sp.

Genus: Ustulina
Ustulina vulgaris Tul.

References

Sources

See also
 List of bacteria of South Africa
 List of Oomycetes of South Africa
 List of slime moulds of South Africa

 List of fungi of South Africa
 List of fungi of South Africa – A
 List of fungi of South Africa – B
 List of fungi of South Africa – C
 List of fungi of South Africa – D
 List of fungi of South Africa – E
 List of fungi of South Africa – F
 List of fungi of South Africa – G
 List of fungi of South Africa – H
 List of fungi of South Africa – I
 List of fungi of South Africa – J
 List of fungi of South Africa – K
 List of fungi of South Africa – L
 List of fungi of South Africa – M
 List of fungi of South Africa – N
 List of fungi of South Africa – O
 List of fungi of South Africa – P
 List of fungi of South Africa – Q
 List of fungi of South Africa – R
 List of fungi of South Africa – S
 List of fungi of South Africa – T
 List of fungi of South Africa – U
 List of fungi of South Africa – V
 List of fungi of South Africa – W
 List of fungi of South Africa – X
 List of fungi of South Africa – Y
 List of fungi of South Africa – Z

Further reading
Kinge TR, Goldman G, Jacobs A, Ndiritu GG, Gryzenhout M (2020) A first checklist of macrofungi for South Africa. MycoKeys 63: 1-48. https://doi.org/10.3897/mycokeys.63.36566

  

Fungi
Fungi U